Robert Alden Hertel (born February 21, 1955) is a former American football quarterback in the National Football League. He was drafted by the Cincinnati Bengals in the fifth round of the 1978 NFL Draft. He played college football at USC.

Hertel also played for the Philadelphia Eagles. He also played baseball at USC and was drafted by MLB teams numerous times.

References

1955 births
Living people
American football quarterbacks
USC Trojans football players
USC Trojans baseball players
Cincinnati Bengals players
Philadelphia Eagles players
Sportspeople from Montebello, California
Players of American football from California
Baseball players from California